Han Qianxi (born 29 January 2002) is a Chinese badminton player.

Career 
Han won her first title the Malaysia Junior International Challenge in 2018. She also contested in the 2018 BWF World Junior Championships, where she finished her campaign in last 32. In 2019, she had string of silver medal performances in the Polish, Swedish, Italian & German  junior international events where she lost to the same rival & compatriot Zhou Meng 4 times. She also had a title win at the Dutch Junior Grand Prix event. She won two medals at the 2019 Badminton Asia Junior Championships as well.

Han was part of the Chinese team that won the 2020 Uber Cup.

Achievements

Asian Junior Championships 
Girls' singles

BWF Junior International (2 titles, 4 runners-up) 
Girls' singles

  BWF Junior International Grand Prix tournament
  BWF Junior International Challenge tournament
  BWF Junior International Series tournament
  BWF Junior Future Series tournament

References

External links 

2002 births
Living people
Chinese female badminton players
Sportspeople from Hangzhou